Sophronica delamarei is a species of beetle in the family Cerambycidae. It was described by Lepesme and Breuning in 1951.

References

Sophronica
Beetles described in 1951